Land of Saints is a 2015 Italian crime-thriller film written and directed  by Fernando Muraca and starring Valeria Solarino. It was shot in Apulia, between Deliceto, Foggia and Gallipoli. It won the  Special Jury Prize at the Annecy Film Festival.

Plot

Cast 
  
Valeria Solarino as Vittoria
Lorenza Indovina as Caterina
Daniela Marra as  Assunta 
Ninni Bruschetta as  Domenico Mercuri 
 Tommaso Ragno as  Alfredo Raso 
 Marco Aiello as  Pasquale Raso 
 Piero Calabrese as  Giuseppe 
 Giuseppe Vitale as L'avvocato 
 Francesco Colella as  Nando Caligiuri

See also 
 List of Italian films of 2015

References

External links 

2015 crime thriller films
Italian crime thriller films
2010s Italian films